The 2015 Division 1, part of the 2015 Swedish football season is the 10th season of Sweden's third-tier football league in its current format. The 2015 fixtures were released in December 2014. The season started on 12 April 2015 and will end on 1 November 2015.

Teams
28 teams contest the league divided into two division, Norra and Södra. 19 returning from the 2014 season, three relegated from Superettan and six promoted from Division 2. The champion of each division will qualify directly for promotion to Superettan, the two runners-up has to play a play-off against the thirteenth and fourteenth team from Superettan to decide who will play in Superettan 2016. The bottom three teams in each division will qualify directly for relegation to Division 2. Due to three relegated teams from Superettan being geographically located in Division 1 Södra, Motala AIF was relocated from Division 1 Södra to Division 1 Norra.

Stadia and locations

Norra

Södra

 1 Correct as of end of 2014 season

Personnel and kits

Norra

Södra

League tables

Norra

Södra

Season statistics

Norra top scorers

Södra top scorers

References

Swedish Football Division 1 seasons
3
Sweden
Sweden